Shape & Destroy (also referred to as SAD) is the second studio album by American country music singer and songwriter Ruston Kelly, released on August 28, 2020. It followed Kelly's 2018 album, Dying Star.

Development 
The album was co-produced by Kelly and longtime collaborator Jarrad Kritzstein and is intended to document's Kelly's path to sobriety. Kelly stated that the album's title was inspired from the practice of free writing, which he sees as a means of self-preservation and catharsis. Kelly's father, Tim "TK" Kelly, sister Abby Kelly, and then-wife Kacey Musgraves contributed backup vocals to the album. "TK" Kelly also contributed on steel guitar.

A significant amount of the writing for the album took place at the home of Johnny Cash and June Carter Cash, with Kelly being invited there by close friend John Carter Cash, an experience which Kelly described as "transformative". He completed the track "Jubilee" at Maybelle Carter's dining table.

Of the recording process, Kelly noted that he wanted "to channel something larger than myself and give myself to the process as fully as possible, because these songs also become the story of whoever hears them" and that “Whatever someone might get out of listening to this record and hearing me express myself in this way, it’s completely theirs.” Kelly explained that he and the band had booked Dreamland Recording Studios for a week but had completed the majority of the album in two days, with Kelly stating that recording there alongside his collaborators "was a highly, highly powerful — without being overbearing — sense of energy. It was reaffirming in so many ways and like nothing I’ve ever been a part of before."

Release and singles 
Kelly released the first single from the album, "Brave", on April 13, 2020. On June 9, 2020, Kelly published the official music video for another song from the album, "Rubber". Pre-orders were made available via Kelly's official website, where various album themed merchandise was also made available, among which was a Shape & Destroy painting from Ruston's video shoot that sold for $3,500.

The album was released on August 28, 2020, through Rounder Records.

Composition

Song inspiration and lyrics 

In an interview with Apple Music, Kelly provided the stories that shaped each song on Shape & Destroy

In the Blue 
“That song declares something important, which was ‘This is who I am. This is what's happening right now. Sometimes it's good, sometimes it's bad, and that's okay. We're going to push through. We're going to try to understand it. We're going to try to mend what I tore many times in my life, whether it was through relationships, drug abuse, self-abuse.’ It's a positive kind of war cry to start the record out.”

Radio Cloud 
“I'm a huge Beat literature fan. There was this school of stream-of-consciousness writing, to write from the subconscious to reveal the truth to yourself that your conscious mind never could. ‘Radio Cloud’ is one of those songs for sure. My way to understand it is just to let the wheel kind of turn. That song, in hindsight, showed me really simple what it is. Moses, Exodus: You have to leave what you've known. You have to grow, and to grow, there's change, and you have to accept who you are, not who you wish you were.”

Alive 
“That song, specifically, was written for my wife at the time to say, ‘Without your encouragement, without you sometimes having to pull me off the fucking ground, I don't know where I would be.’ Or my dad—the fact that my dad and my family, they never gave up and they let me fail. If you have people like that in your life, then you have to say something like ‘It is because of you.’ I mean, no man is an island. You can't do it alone. Even though my marriage ended, that song to me rings even more true now, and I think it might be the first real love song I've ever had that I can completely dedicate to one person.”

Changes 
“Sometimes sadness or despair has to have a backbeat. ‘Changes,’ it was the statement of, ‘Look, this may be difficult for me, but it could be doubly difficult for you, and I understand that.’”

Mid-Morning Lament 
“To me that's where the battleground [of addiction] is—it's while you're making coffee or folding your clothes and you're like, ‘Damn, I wish I wasn't feeling the way I felt right now.’ What I think every addict craves is bliss. I think joy is kind of the prerequisite to bliss, and we all knew that when we were children. It's a lament about the fact that those things get harder and harder to find the more you cover them up when you get older.”

Brave 
“To be brave, I think it has to do with the union of you being masculine and feminine. There's a place for masculinity, but there's a much-needed place, I feel like, for men in this day and age to embrace what the feminine side has to empower you. To courageously say, ‘I want to live by my words. I want to make promises. I want to keep those promises. I want to be everything that I can be.’ That isn't just physical strength. To be brave, to me, is to live up to the principles in the face of an easier route.”

Clean 
“It’s more of a positive claim that remembering your youth, not as something lost, but as something absorbed into what you are now, is what's going to mature you and bring you that joy. A lot of this record is to remind yourself that the beauty, the joy, the freedom, the wide-openness of your spirit when you're young can apply now.”

Rubber 
“What I was up to with that one was really trying to come to terms with the fact that sometimes in your life, when you aren't so sure of yourself yet and you're pulled in many directions, you don't really own your own substance. You're too malleable. It's not that you are weak, but you haven't decided how to move forward yet, so all you do is get pulled in a multitude of ways that aren't your own ways.”

Jubilee 
“‘Jubilee’ was written at Mother Maybelle's house. I'm a huge Carter Family fan. John Carter Cash was a friend of mine. He would just call me to check in and be like, ‘Hey, man. You know my grandmother's house is open. It's just kind of sitting there out in Virginia.’ And I was like, ‘Okay, Mother Maybelle is one of my biggest influences of all time.’ So I went out there, and it's like being in a museum without glass. It was pretty crazy. Little notes in the junk drawer that Johnny Cash wrote to Kris Kristofferson on directions of how to get to the house, shit like that. I didn't know what I needed until I got to that house, when it comes to spiritual matters. ‘Jubilee’ was this kind of exaltation to something greater than myself and my internal insecurities, struggles, blockades I put up.”

Closest Thing 
“That's the only song that's co-written on the record—me and my buddy Ashley Ray. It came out in 20 minutes because it just was that honest: ‘This is the biggest statement of love I can make, is an approximation to these fantastical things.’ No one hung the moon. No one created the brightness in the stars. But they remind you of it so deeply, it's almost as if they did. Saying, ‘I love you in that way. You are the closest thing to that on Earth I've ever experienced,’ I think that's an even bigger statement of love than saying, ‘You are those things.’”

Pressure 
“I like to juxtapose. This song has a super heavy sentiment of physical force to it, and it's this little, light folk song. If you can lighten the mood somehow but still mean it, then I feel like it gives you power over what that thing is. To fingerpick this song with one of the heavier-hitting themes on the record was to say, ‘I can be with this feeling and sing through it, and do it calmly because I'm in control of it.’”

Under the Sun 
“That one was like, ‘Okay, we are a band and we are going to take this shit so hard on the road, so let's make it sound like that.’ That song is always going to be this anthemic thing. I wanted elements of this record to feel like there was some not internal aggression in a negative sense, but a fuel that needed to be lit. And I feel like that song was when the fuse was lit.”

Hallelujah Anyway 
“That song is the song that if I lived on an island and I only wrote that song, I feel like it would be the best song that I've ever written, because it's the most important song for me. I needed that song. I want to live by that song. Even the engineer came in and sang the high soprano part. We wanted something ancient about it, in a way, and I don't think there's anything more musically ancient than a collection of voices singing to the same effect.”

Reception 
Prior to the release of the album, Rolling Stone magazine described the song "Rubber" as a "meditative ballad that builds from circular, fingerstyle acoustic guitar to a spacious full-band arrangement".

Track listing

References 

2020 albums
Rounder Records albums
Ruston Kelly albums